Brant is a hamlet in southern Alberta, Canada within Vulcan County. It is named after the number of Brant in the area. Brant is home to a grain elevator and a Christian School.

Demographics 
The population of Brant according to the 2007 municipal census conducted by Vulcan County is 78.

See also 
List of communities in Alberta
List of hamlets in Alberta

References 

Hamlets in Alberta
Vulcan County